Kim Ho-joong is a Korean classical crossover singer and tenor born on October 2, 1991. He came to prominence in both popular music and classical music in Korea in 2020.
He was discharged from military service on June 9, 2022. After being discharged, he performed with Spanish opera singer Plácido Domingo and collaborated with Korean pianist Yiruma. His second classic album Panorama, released in July 2022, recorded 700,000 copies initial album sales.

Philanthropy 
On March 22, 2022, Kim donated 500 pieces of Geumsan Aesthetic Red Ginseng products (worth 67.5 million won) to Sky Garden under the Welfare Foundation of Love, a social welfare company.

On February 23, 2023, Kim donated 50 million won to help in the 2023 Turkey–Syria earthquake through UNICEF Korea Committee.

Discography

Studio albums

Singles

Filmography

Film

Television shows

Ambassadorship 
First Asian Ambassador to the Luciano Pavarotti Foundation and the Andrea Bocelli Foundation (2022)

Awards and nominations

Listicles

References 

Living people
1991 births
People from Ulsan
Mr Trot participants
South Korean male singers
Trot singers